Polyipnus bruuni is a species of ray-finned fish in the genus Polyipnus. It is found in the Western Indian Ocean off Kenya in shallow waters from 0 - 240 meters.

References

Sternoptychidae
Endemic fauna of Kenya
Fish of Kenya
Fish described in 1994